Jaroslav Šír (born 8 November 1923) is a former Czechoslovak soldier and skier. He is from Liberec.

Šír was born in Poniklá. He started skiing in the age of 15, and was in the national ski team from 1948 to 1955. As a conscript he served at the army sports club in Prague (Armádní tělocvičný klub). In the rank of a Vojín he was a member of the national Olympic military patrol team at the 1948 Winter Olympics which placed sixth. Before they went to St. Moritz, they trained in Špindlerův Mlýn.

References 

1923 births
Living people
Czechoslovak military patrol (sport) runners
Olympic biathletes of Czechoslovakia
Military patrol competitors at the 1948 Winter Olympics
Sportspeople from Liberec